The 2005 Lunar New Year Cup (also known as Carlsberg Cup for sponsorship reasons) was a football tournament held in Hong Kong on 9 February 2005, the first day of the Chinese New Year 2005.

Participating teams
 (first appearance)
 (host)

Squads

Brazil

Head coach: Carlos Alberto Parreira

Hong Kong

Head coach: Lai Sun Cheung

Results
All times given in Hong Kong Time (UTC+8).

Top scorers
2 goals
 Ricardo Oliveira
1 goal
 Alex
 Lúcio
 Roberto Carlos
 Robinho
 Ronaldinho
 Lee Sze Ming

See also
Hong Kong Football Association
Hong Kong First Division League

External links
Match report at hkfa.com
 Match stats at uol.com.br

Lunar New Year Cup, 2005
Lunar New Year Cup, 2005
2005